Edinburgh UK Tracker Trust is a large British investment trust dedicated to investing in a portfolio which tracks the FTSE All-Share Index. Established in 1990, the company is a constituent of the FTSE SmallCap Index. The Chairman is Tom Ross. It was renamed to Aberdeen UK Tracker Trust PLC in April 2013.

References
 Official site

Investment trusts of the United Kingdom